Downtown Melrose is the central business district of Melrose, Massachusetts. It is known for its nineteenth century Victorian architecture and its many small family-owned stores.  Downtown Melrose is generally classified as the area on Main Street from Grove Street to Essex/Upham Streets.  Part of the area, running on Main Street just northeast of the junction with Upham and Essex Streets, is included in the Melrose Town Center Historic District, which was added to the National Register of Historic Places on April 1, 1982.  This district encompasses seven buildings, including city hall, the main fire station, Memorial Hall, the Coolidge School, and the Baptist and Methodist churches.

See also
National Register of Historic Places listings in Middlesex County, Massachusetts

References

Melrose
Melrose, Massachusetts
Historic districts in Middlesex County, Massachusetts
Historic districts on the National Register of Historic Places in Massachusetts
National Register of Historic Places in Middlesex County, Massachusetts
Victorian architecture in Massachusetts